Margaret Brown (née Tobin; July 18, 1867 – October 26, 1932), posthumously known as "The Unsinkable Molly Brown", was an American socialite and philanthropist. She was a passenger on the RMS Titanic which sank in 1912 and she unsuccessfully urged the crew in Lifeboat No. 6 to return to the debris field to look for survivors. 

During her lifetime, her friends called her "Maggie", but by her death, obituaries referred to her as the "Unsinkable Mrs. Brown". The "Molly" nickname was coined by 1960 Broadway musical based on her life and its 1964 film adaptation which were both entitled The Unsinkable Molly Brown.

Early life
Margaret Tobin is believed by scholars to have been born on July 18, 1867, in a cottage near the Mississippi River in Hannibal, Missouri, on Denkler's Alley. The three-room cottage is now the Molly Brown Birthplace and Museum on 600 Butler Street in Hannibal. Her parents were Irish Catholic immigrants John Tobin (1821–1899), an abolitionist who supported the Underground Railroad, and Johanna (Collins) Tobin (1825–1905). Her siblings were Daniel Tobin (born 1863), Michael Tobin (born 1866), William Tobin (born 1869), and Helen Tobin (born 1871). Both of Margaret's parents were widowed and remarried as young adults. Brown had two half-sisters: Catherine Bridget Tobin (born 1856), by her father's first marriage, and Mary Ann Collins (born 1857), by her mother's first marriage.

Called Maggie by her family, she attended her maternal aunt's school, Mary O'Leary's grammar school, which was across the street from her home. Nearby was also the Hannibal Gas Works where her father worked as a laborer. Their neighborhood was a tight-knit Irish Catholic community, where people traveled westward through the town for the gold fields.

At age 18, Margaret relocated to Leadville, Colorado, with her siblings Daniel Tobin, Mary Ann Collins Landrigan, and Mary Ann's husband John Landrigan. Margaret and her brother Daniel shared a two-room log cabin, and she found work sewing carpets and draperies at a dry goods store, Daniels, Fisher and Smith. Daniel was a miner.

Marriage and children

In Leadville, she met and married James Joseph Brown (1854–1922), nicknamed "J.J.", an imaginative, self-educated man. He was not a rich man, and she married J.J. for love. She said,

Margaret and J.J. married in Leadville Annunciation Church on September 1, 1886. They had two children: Lawrence Palmer Brown (1887–1949), known as Larry, and Catherine Ellen Brown (1889–1969), known as Helen. They also raised three of their nieces: Grace, Florence, and Helen Tobin.

Mining success
The Brown family acquired great wealth when in 1893, J.J.'s mining engineering efforts proved instrumental in the exploration of a substantial ore seam at the Little Jonny Mine. His employer, Ibex Mining Company, awarded him 12,500 shares of stock and a seat on the board. In Leadville, Margaret helped by working in soup kitchens to assist miners' families.

In 1894, the Browns bought a $30,000 Victorian mansion in Denver now known as the Molly Brown House, and in 1897, they built a summer house, Avoca Lodge in Southwest Denver near Bear Creek, which gave the family more social opportunities. Margaret became a charter member of the Denver Woman's Club, whose mission was the improvement of women's lives by continuing education and philanthropy.  Adjusting to the trappings of a society lady, Brown became well-immersed in the arts and fluent in French, German, Italian, and Russian. Brown co-founded a branch in Denver of the Alliance Française to promote her love of French culture. She lobbied for women's right to vote.

Brown gave parties that were attended by Denver socialites, but she was unable to gain entry into the most elite group, Sacred 36, who attended exclusive bridge parties and dinners held by Louise Sneed Hill. Brown called her "the snobbiest woman in Denver".

J.J. was not interested in the social life that Brown enjoyed and the couple began to drift apart. After 23 years of marriage, Margaret and J.J. privately signed a separation agreement in 1909. She received a $700 monthly allowance to continue her travels and political work.

Brown assisted in fundraising for Denver's Cathedral of the Immaculate Conception, which was completed in 1911. She also worked with Judge Ben Lindsey to help destitute children and establish one of the United States' first juvenile courts.

Passenger on the Titanic
Brown spent the first months of 1912 in Paris, visiting her daughter and as part of the John Jacob Astor IV party, until she received word from Denver that her eldest grandchild, Lawrence Palmer Brown Jr., was seriously ill. She immediately booked passage on the first available liner leaving for New York, the RMS Titanic. Originally, her daughter Helen was supposed to accompany her, but Helen, who had studied at the Sorbonne in Paris, decided to take a side trip to London with friends. Brown boarded the Titanic as a first-class passenger on the evening of April 10, conveyed aboard the tender SS Nomadic at Cherbourg, France,  and sailed for New York City that night.

The Titanic sank early on April 15, 1912, at around 2:20 a.m., after striking an iceberg at around 11:40 p.m. the previous night. “Molly” Brown helped other people board the lifeboats but was finally persuaded to abandon ship in lifeboat no. 6. More than 1,500 aboard the "unsinkable ship" perished; there were a total of 2,224 people on the ship. Brown was later called "The Unsinkable Molly Brown" by authors because she helped in the ship's evacuation, taking an oar herself in her lifeboat and urging the lifeboat crew to go back and save more passengers. Her urgings were met with opposition from Quartermaster Robert Hichens, the crewman in charge of lifeboat 6. Hichens was fearful that if they were to go back, the lifeboat would either be pulled down due to suction, or those in the water would swamp the boat in an effort to get in. After several attempts to urge Hichens to turn back, Brown threatened to throw him overboard.

Upon being rescued by the ship RMS Carpathia, Brown proceeded to organize a committee with other first-class survivors. The committee worked to secure basic necessities for the second- and third-class survivors, and even provided informal counseling.

Later life and death
In 1914, six years before the Nineteenth Amendment granted women the right to vote, Brown ran for Colorado's U.S. Senate seat, but she ended her campaign to serve abroad as the director of the American Committee for Devastated France during World War I. For her work organizing female ambulance drivers, nurses, and food distributors, Brown was awarded the French Legion of Honor in 1932. Also in 1914, she contributed to miners and their families during the 1914 Ludlow coal mine disaster and she organized the International Women's Rights conference that year, which was held in Newport, Rhode Island.

J.J. Brown died on September 5, 1922. Margaret told newspapers, that although she had met royalty and other great people around the world, "I've never met a finer, bigger, more worthwhile man than J.J. Brown."

J.J. Brown left vast, yet complicated, real estate, mining, and stock holdings. It was unknown to the Browns and their lawyers how much was left in the estate. Prior to J.J.’s death, he had transferred a large amount of money to his children. Their children were also unaware how much money Margaret had, but were displeased at the large amounts she spent on charity.  Margaret and her children fought in court for six years to settle the estate.

During the last years of her life, Brown was an actress. She died in her sleep at 10:55 p.m. on October 26, 1932, at age 65, in New York City's Barbizon Hotel. Subsequent autopsy revealed a brain tumor. She was buried next to J.J. at St. Brigid's cemetery, now known as Cemetery of the Holy Rood, in Westbury, New York, following a small ceremony on October 31, 1932, attended by close friends and family. There was singing, but no eulogy.

Legacy
Margaret's fame as a Titanic survivor helped her promote the philanthropic and activism issues she felt strongly about. She was concerned about the rights of workers and women, education and literacy for children, historic preservation, and commemoration of the bravery and chivalry displayed by the men aboard the Titanic. During World War I in France, she worked with the American Committee for Devastated France to rebuild areas behind the front line, and helped wounded French and American soldiers. She was awarded the French Légion d'Honneur for her good citizenship, activism, and philanthropy in America.

In 1985, she was inducted into the Colorado Women's Hall of Fame.

Portrayals
Thelma Ritter (1953) (Titanic). Brown's name was changed to Maude Young, and her Colorado gold mining fortune became a Montana lead mining fortune.
Cloris Leachman (1957) (Telephone Time) ("The Unsinkable Molly Brown")
Tucker McGuire (1958) (A Night to Remember)
Tammy Grimes (1960) (The Unsinkable Molly Brown) (Broadway musical) Grimes won a Tony Award for her performance.
Debbie Reynolds (1964) (The Unsinkable Molly Brown). Reynolds received an Academy Award nomination for Best Actress.
Cloris Leachman (1979) (S.O.S. Titanic) (TV movie)
Fionnula Flanagan (1983) (Voyagers!) ("Voyagers of the Titanic")
Marilu Henner (1996) (Titanic) (TV miniseries)
Kathy Bates (1997) (Titanic)
Judy Prestininzi (2003) (Ghosts of the Abyss) (Documentary)
Linda Kash (2012) (Titanic) (TV series/2 episodes)
Beth Malone (2020) (2020 off-Broadway revival)

Notes

References

Further reading

External links

 
 Molly Brown House Museum, Denver

1867 births
1932 deaths
20th-century American actresses
20th-century American philanthropists
Actresses from Colorado
Actresses from Missouri
American film actresses
American people of Irish descent
American socialites
American women in World War I
Burials at the Cemetery of the Holy Rood
Catholics from Colorado
Catholics from Missouri
Deaths from brain cancer in the United States
James Joseph Brown family
People from Hannibal, Missouri
People from Leadville, Colorado
Philanthropists from Missouri
Recipients of the Legion of Honour
RMS Titanic survivors